PS Limerick was a passenger vessel built for the Great Western Railway in 1874.

History

She was built by William Simons and Company of Renfrew and launched on 20 May 1874 by Miss Baird, niece of Mr Glover, consulting engineer of the Great Western Railway. She undertook sea trials in June and on 12 June realised a speed of 14 knots over 90 miles.

She was scrapped in 1902 in Dordrecht.

References

1874 ships
Passenger ships of the United Kingdom
Paddle steamers of the United Kingdom
Steamships of the United Kingdom
Ships built on the River Clyde
Ships of the Great Western Railway